Ralph Spraggon (13 August 1872 – 11 September 1939) was a New Zealand cricketer. He played six first-class matches for Otago between 1894 and 1897.

See also
 List of Otago representative cricketers

References

External links
 

1872 births
1939 deaths
New Zealand cricketers
Otago cricketers
Cricketers from Dunedin